Sergey Nikolayevich Tsyganov (born 4 January 1992) is a Russian former football forward.

Club career
He made his Russian Football National League debut for FC Yenisey Krasnoyarsk on 27 July 2014 in a game against FC Tyumen.

Honours
Zimbru Chișinău
Moldovan Cup : 2013–14

External links

 Profile at soccer.ru

1992 births
Footballers from Saint Petersburg
Russian footballers
Russia youth international footballers
Living people
FC Zimbru Chișinău players
Russian expatriate footballers
Expatriate footballers in Moldova
Association football forwards
FC Yenisey Krasnoyarsk players
FC Dynamo Barnaul players
FC Nizhny Novgorod (2015) players
Moldovan Super Liga players
FC Zenit Saint Petersburg players
FC Volga Ulyanovsk players
FC Mashuk-KMV Pyatigorsk players